Pierre-Étienne Pollez (born 19 July 1983 in Meudon) is a French rower.

References 

 

1983 births
Living people
French male rowers
People from Meudon
World Rowing Championships medalists for France
Sportspeople from Hauts-de-Seine